Lam Kam San (born 10 May 1971) is a Macanese racing driver previously competing in the World Touring Car Championship driver, where he made his debut in 2013.

Racing career
Lam began his career in 2002 in the Asian Touring Car Series. In 2004 he switched to the Asian Formula Renault Series. In 2013 Lam made his World Touring Car Championship debut with China Dragon Racing driving a Chevrolet Lacetti in the last round in Macau. Lam participated in the season finale of the 2018 World Touring Car Cup at the Guia Circuit in Macau for Champ Motorsport but failed to qualify for all three races.

Racing record

Complete World Touring Car Championship results
(key) (Races in bold indicate pole position – 1 point awarded just in first race; races in italics indicate fastest lap – 1 point awarded all races; * signifies that driver led race for at least one lap – 1 point given all races)

Complete World Touring Car Cup results
(key) (Races in bold indicate pole position) (Races in italics indicate fastest lap)

TCR Spa 500 results

References

External links
 

1971 births
Living people
World Touring Car Championship drivers
Macau racing drivers
Asian Formula Renault Challenge drivers
World Touring Car Cup drivers
Chinese F4 Championship drivers